Joshua is the seventh solo studio album by American singer-songwriter Dolly Parton. It was released on April 12, 1971, by RCA Victor. The album was produced by Bob Ferguson. It peaked at number 16 on the Billboard Top Country Albums chart and number 198 on the Billboard 200 chart. The album's single, "Joshua", was nominated for a Grammy and was Parton's first song to reach number one on the Billboard Hot Country Songs chart.

Release and promotion
The album was released April 12, 1971, on LP and 8-track.

Singles
The album's single, "Joshua", was released in November 1970 and peaked at number one on the Billboard Hot Country Songs chart and number 108 on the Billboard Bubbling Under Hot 100 chart. The single peaked at number two in Canada on the RPM Country Singles chart.

Critical reception

The review published in the April 24, 1971 issue of Billboard said, "Dolly Parton took "Joshua" right to the top of the country singles chart, and she should now take him right to the top of the LP chart as well, with this exceptional album followup. Most of the tunes
are originals, and there are many standouts, among them "You Can't Reach Me Anymore", "The Last One to Touch Me", and "Chicken Every Sunday"."

The April 10, 1971 issue of Cashbox featured a review that said, "Dolly Parton's "Joshua" has to be one of the all-time best country records ever recorded. Now the title tune of her latest album, it enables those who missed it the first time around to hear it along with nine other fine selections. Always a best seller, this LP containing "The Last One to Touch Me", "Walls of My Mind", "Chicken Every Sunday", "Letter
to Heaven", and "J.J. Sneed", which are outstanding tracks, is sure to top the charts shortly.

AllMusic gave the album 3.5 out of 5 stars.

Commercial performance
The album peaked at number 16 on the Billboard Top Country Albums chart and number 198 on the Billboard 200 chart. The album peaked at number 24 in Canada on the RPM Country Albums chart.

Accolades
The album's single, "Joshua", was nominated for Best Country Vocal Performance, Female, at the 14th Annual Grammy Awards.

Recording
Recording sessions for the album began at RCA Studio B in Nashville, Tennessee, on April 20, 1970. There additional sessions followed on October 21, 1970, January 26, and February 11, 1971. "Walls of My Mind", "You Can't Reach Me Anymore", and "The Fire's Still Burning" were recorded during the October 31, 1969 session for 1970's The Fairest of Them All.

Reissues
The album was reissued on CD in 2001 with Parton's 1971 album Coat of Many Colors. It was released as a digital download on December 4, 2015.

Track listing

Personnel
Adapted from the album liner notes.
Bobby Dyson – liner notes
Bob Ferguson – producer
Bill Meyers – cover art
Al Pachucki – recording engineer
Roy Shockley – recording technician

Charts

Release history

References

Dolly Parton albums
1971 albums
RCA Records albums
Albums produced by Bob Ferguson (music)